Piet de Wit (born 6 March 1946) is a retired cyclist from the Netherlands who won the Amateur UCI Motor-paced World Championships in 1966 and 1967.His sporting career began with DTS Zaandam.  He then moved into the professionals category and won another three medals in 1968, 1970 and 1973.

He was raised with three sisters in a biking family – his parents worked for a bicycle company. After retiring from active competitions in 1974, he established a family-run bicycle shop in his native Wormer, which later expanded into a chain in North Holland. In 1994 he passed the shop management to his business partner Martin Slagt.

References

1946 births
Living people
Dutch male cyclists
People from Wormerland
Cyclists from North Holland